Limelight  (also known as Drummond light or calcium light) is a type of stage lighting once used in theatres and music halls. An intense illumination is created when a flame fed by oxygen and hydrogen is directed at a cylinder of quicklime (calcium oxide), which can be heated to  before melting.  The light is produced by a combination of incandescence and candoluminescence. Although it has long since been replaced by electric lighting, the term has nonetheless survived, as someone in the public eye is still said to be "in the limelight". The actual lamps are called "limes", a term which has been transferred to electrical equivalents.

History

Discovery and invention
The limelight effect was discovered in the 1820s by Goldsworthy Gurney, based on his work with the "oxy-hydrogen blowpipe", credit for which is normally given to Robert Hare.  In 1825, a Scottish engineer, Thomas Drummond (1797–1840), saw a demonstration of the effect by Michael Faraday and realized that the light would be useful for surveying.  Drummond built a working version in 1826, and the device is sometimes called the Drummond light after him.

Early use in the United Kingdom
The earliest known use of limelight at a public performance was outdoors, over Herne Bay Pier, Kent, on the night of 3 October 1836 to illuminate a juggling performance by magician Ching Lau Lauro. This performance was part of the celebrations following the laying of the foundation stone of the Clock Tower. The advertising leaflet called it koniaphostic light and announced that "the whole pier is overwhelmed with a flood of beautiful white light". Limelight was first used for indoor stage illumination in the Covent Garden Theatre in London in 1837 and enjoyed widespread use in theatres around the world in the 1860s and 1870s.
Limelights were employed to highlight solo performers in the same manner as modern spotlights.

Early use in the United States
During the American Civil War in July and August 1863 calcium lights were used during the siege of Fort Wagner, allowing Union forces to illuminate their artillery target at night while simultaneously blinding Confederate gunners and riflemen. Calcium lights were also installed on Union Navy ships.

Limelight was replaced by electric arc lighting in the late 19th century.

Gallery

See also

 Klieg light
 List of light sources
 Nineteenth-century theatrical scenery
 Timeline of hydrogen technologies
 Zirconia light

References

Bibliography

  
 Art Gallery of South Australia History of Limelights

Types of lamp
Stage lighting
Scottish inventions
Hydrogen technologies